Carlos Adrián Valdez Suárez (born 2 May 1983) is a Uruguayan football player. He currently plays for Boston River.

Football career
Valdez began his career with Club Nacional de Football before moving to clubs in Italy. He made his Serie A debut against Empoli F.C. on 23 October 2005. Recently he has signed a 6-month contract with Peñarol.

Valdez has made 17 appearances for the Uruguay national football team, and played in the Copa América 2007.

On July 27, 2010 he was reserved to play a friendly match against Angola in Lisbon .

Clubs

References

External links

1983 births
Living people
Footballers from Montevideo
Uruguayan footballers
Uruguay international footballers
2007 Copa América players
Peñarol players
Club Nacional de Football players
Treviso F.B.C. 1993 players
Reggina 1914 players
A.C.N. Siena 1904 players
Boston River players
Uruguayan Primera División players
Serie A players
Serie B players
Expatriate footballers in Italy
Uruguayan expatriate footballers
Uruguayan expatriate sportspeople in Italy
Association football defenders